The Regional Championship of Asturias (Spanish: Campeonato Regional de Asturias) was a football tournament played in Spain, organized by the Asturian Federation. It was played annually between 1916 and 1940 by the clubs affiliated in this.

In the 1931–32 it was played together with the championship of Cantabria and in the 1935–36, with that of Galicia.

List of winners

Champions

Editions

1918–19

1919–20

1920–21

1921–22

1922–23

1923–24

1924–25

1925–26

1926–27

1927–28

1928–29

1929–30

1930–31

1931–32 (played with Cantabria)

1932–33

1933–34

1934–35

1935–36 (played with Galicia)

1939–40

References
 Martínez Calatrava, Vicente (2001). Historia y estadística del fúbol español.

External links
 RSSSF - List of Champions of Asturias

Football in Asturias
Defunct football leagues in Spain
History of football in Spain